The 2019–20 Division 1 Féminine season, also known as D1 Arkema for sponsorship reasons, was the 46th edition of Division 1 Féminine since its establishment in 1974. The season began on 24 August 2019 and was scheduled to end on 30 May 2020. Lyon were the defending champions, having won the title for last thirteen consecutive seasons. This was the first ever season with a title sponsor for the league, after FFF announced a three-year deal with French chemicals firm Arkema.

After 16 match days, the season was abandoned due to the COVID-19 pandemic in France. Lyon were declared champions, and Paris joined them in qualification for the 2020–21 UEFA Women's Champions League.

Teams

A total of 12 teams compete in the league. Champions and runners-up of previous season's Division 2 Féminine replaced two relegated teams from last season's Division 1 Féminine. Reims and Marseille replaced Rodez and Lille this season.

Results

League table
The final standings after the abandonment were:

Positions by round
The table lists the positions of teams after each week of matches. In order to preserve chronological evolvements, any postponed matches are not included to the round at which they were originally scheduled, but added to the full round they were played immediately afterwards.

Season statistics

Top scorers

Top assists

Most clean sheets

Hat-tricks

4 Player scored four goals.

References

External links

Division 1 Féminine seasons
2019–20 domestic women's association football leagues
Division 1 Féminine
France